Mark Borisovich Shchukin (October 10, 1937 - July 14, 2008) was a Russian archaeologist. He was Professor of Archaeology at the Saint Petersburg State University and a researcher on archaeology at the Hermitage Museum and the Russian Academy of Sciences. He was also a corresponding member at the German Archaeological Institute. Schukin specialized in the study of the Iron Age cultures of Eastern Europe and their interaction with the classical world.

See also
 Roger Batty

References

 Петербургский апокриф: Послание от Марка. — СПб., Кишинев, 2011. — 588 с.
 Пам’яті Марка Борисовича Щукіна // Археологія. — 2009. — Вип. 4. — С. 112—113.
 Открытая археология: Марк Щукин

1937 births
2008 deaths
German Archaeological Institute
Archaeologists from Saint Petersburg
Saint Petersburg State University alumni
Academic staff of Saint Petersburg State University
20th-century archaeologists